James Hunter CBE (born 1948) is a historian of the Highlands and Islands of Scotland. He completed his Ph.D. thesis at the University of Edinburgh before taking up a post with the Institute for the Study of Sparsely Populated Areas at the University of Aberdeen.  In 2005 he founded the Centre for History in Dornoch as part of the University of the Highlands and Islands, and served as the head of the Centre between 2005 and 2010. Hunter has held a number of additional posts: he was the director of the Scottish Crofters Union (1985–1990), Chairman of the Isle of Eigg Heritage Trust (2004–2007) and Chairman of Highlands and Islands Enterprise (1998–2004), the Inverness-based development and training agency for the North of Scotland. He was elected as a Fellow of the Royal Society of Edinburgh in 2007.

He is a freelance historian and author, and has written thirteen books on the Highlands and Islands and its global diaspora.

His recent books include Set Adrift Upon the World: The Sutherland Clearances, published in 2015. The book presents the struggle for survival of the people cleared from the straths of Sutherland during the early nineteenth century and relocated to Canada, landing at Hudson Bay. This book was the winner of the Saltire Society's History Book of the Year Award in 2016. In 2019 his account of the Highland Famine of 1846–47, Insurrection: Scotland's Famine Winter was published.

Hunter gave the first Sabhal Mòr Lecture in 1990.

Works
From British Library catalogue (Accessed January 2007).

 1976. The Highland Land War of the 1880s, in Burnett, Ray (ed.), Calgacus 3, Spring 1976, pp. 5 – 9, 
 1976. The making of the crofting community. Edinburgh: John Donald. (revised edition, 2000, .)
 1981. Year of the Émigré, in The Bulletin of Scottish Politics No. 2, Spring 1981, pp. 56 – 66
 1986. Skye : the island. Edinburgh: Mainstream. .
 1991. The claim of crofting : the Scottish Highlands and Islands, 1930-1990. Edinburgh: Mainstream. .
 1991. Rural poverty and deprivation in Europe : from analysis to action : report of a seminar held in Scotland from 7 to 11 October 1990 . Enstone: Arkleton Trust. .
 1992. Scottish highlanders : a people and their place. Edinburgh: Mainstream. .
 1992. Wilderness in North America and Scotland: the human dimension, in Mollinon, Denis (ed.), Wilderness with People: The Management of Wild Land, John Muir Trust, pp. 6 – 12
 1992. Guest editorial on the possible privatisation of the Forestry Commission, in Reforesting Scotland No. 7, Autumn 1992, p. 2, 
 1994. A dance called America : the Scottish Highlands, the United States and Canada. Edinburgh: Mainstream. .
 1995. On the other side of sorrow : nature and people in the Scottish Highlands. Edinburgh: Mainstream. .
 1996. Towards a land reform agenda for a Scots parliament. Perth: Rural Forum Scotland. .
 1996. Glencoe and the Indians : a real-life family saga which spans two continents, several centuries and more than thirty generations to link Scotland’s clans with the native peoples of the American West. Edinburgh: Mainstream. .
 1999. Last of the free : a millennial history of the Highlands and Islands of Scotland Edinburgh: Mainstream. .
 2001. Culloden and the last clansman. Edinburgh: Mainstream. .
 2006. Fonn's Duthchas. National Museums of Scotland. .
 2007. Scottish Exodus: Travels among a worldwide clan. Edinburgh: Mainstream. .
2012. From the Low Tide of the Sea to the Highest Mountain Tops. Isle of Lewis: The Islands Book Trust.
2015. Set Adrift Upon the World: The Sutherland Clearances. Edinburgh: Birlinn. .

With Others
 Edited by Celeste Ray; foreword by James Hunter (2005). Transatlantic Scots. London: University of Alabama Press. .

References

Living people
1948 births
People from Argyll and Bute
Commanders of the Order of the British Empire
Alumni of the University of Edinburgh
Alumni of the University of Aberdeen
20th-century Scottish historians
Fellows of the Royal Society of Edinburgh
People educated at Oban High School
21st-century Scottish historians